The history of Uruguay comprises different periods: the pre-Columbian time or early history (up to the 16th century), the Colonial Period (1516–1811), the Period of Nation-Building (1811–1830), and the history of Uruguay as an independent country (1830).

Native

The earliest traces of human presence are about 10,000 years old and belong to the hunter-gatherer cultures of Catalanense and Cuareim cultures, which are extensions of cultures originating in Brazil. The earliest discovered bolas is about 7,000 years old. Examples of ancient rock art have been found at Chamangá. About 4,000 years ago, Charrúa and Guarani people arrived here. During precolonial times, Uruguayan territory was inhabited by small tribes of nomadic Charrúa, Chaná, Arachán, and Guarani peoples who survived by hunting and fishing and probably never reached more than 10,000 to 20,000 people. It is estimated that there were about 9,000 Charrúa and 6,000 Chaná and Guaraní at the time of first contact with Europeans in the 1500s. The native peoples had almost disappeared by the time of Uruguay's independence as a result of European diseases and constant warfare.

European genocide culminated on 11 April 1831 with the Massacre of Salsipuedes, when most of the Charrúa men were killed by the Uruguayan army on the orders of President Fructuoso Rivera. The remaining 300 Charrúa women and children were divided as household slaves and servants among Europeans.

Colonization

During the colonial era, the present-day territory of Uruguay was known as Banda Oriental (east bank of River Uruguay) and was a buffer territory between the competing colonial pretensions of Portuguese Brazil and the Spanish Empire. The Portuguese first explored the region of present-day Uruguay in 1512–1513.

The first European explorer to land there was Juan Díaz de Solís in 1516, but he was killed by natives. Ferdinand Magellan anchored at the future site of Montevideo in 1520. Sebastian Cabot in 1526 explored Río de la Plata, but no permanent settlements were established at that time. The absence of gold and silver limited the settlement of the region during the 16th and 17th centuries. In 1603, cattle and horses were introduced by the order of Hernando Arias de Saavedra, and, by the mid-17th century, their number had greatly multiplied. The first permanent settlement on the territory of present-day Uruguay was founded by Spanish Jesuits in 1624 at Villa Soriano on the Río Negro, where they tried to establish a Misiones Orientales system for the Charrúas.
 
In 1680, Portuguese colonists established Colônia do Sacramento on the northern bank of La Plata river, on the opposite coast from Buenos Aires. Spanish colonial activity increased as Spain sought to limit Portugal's expansion of Brazil's frontiers. In 1726, the Spanish established San Felipe de Montevideo on the northern bank and its natural harbor soon developed into a commercial center competing with Buenos Aires. They also moved to capture Côlonia del Sacramento. The 1750 Treaty of Madrid secured Spanish control over Banda Oriental, settlers were given land here and a local cabildo was created.

In 1776, the new Viceroyalty of Rio de la Plata was established with its capital at Buenos Aires, and it included the territory of Banda Oriental. By this time, the land had been divided among cattle ranchers, and beef was becoming a major product. By 1800, more than 10,000 people lived in Montevideo and another 20,000 in the rest of the province. Out of these, about 30 percent were African slaves.

Uruguay's early 19th-century history was shaped by an ongoing conflict between the British, Spanish, Portuguese, and local colonial forces for dominance of the La Plata Basin. In 1806 and 1807, during the Anglo-Spanish War (1796–1808), the British launched invasions. Buenos Aires was taken in 1806 and then liberated by forces from Montevideo led by Santiago de Liniers. In a new and stronger British attack in 1807, Montevideo was occupied by a 10,000-strong British force. The British forces were unable to invade Buenos Aires for the second time, however, and Liniers demanded the liberation of Montevideo in the terms of capitulation. The British gave up their attacks when the Peninsular War turned Great Britain and Spain into allies against Napoleon.

Struggle for independence, 1811–1828

Provincial freedom under Artigas

The May Revolution of 1810 in Buenos Aires marked the end of Spanish rule in the Vice-royalty and the establishment of the United Provinces of the Río de la Plata. The Revolution divided the inhabitants of Montevideo between royalists, who remained loyal to the Spanish crown (many of which remained so), and revolutionaries, who supported the independence of the provinces from Spain. This soon led to the First Banda Oriental campaign between Buenos Aires and the Spanish viceroy.

Local patriots under José Gervasio Artigas issued the Proclamation of 26 February 1811, which called for a war against the Spanish rule. With the help from Buenos Aires, Artigas defeated Spaniards on 18 May 1811 at the Battle of Las Piedras and began Siege of Montevideo. At this point, Spanish viceroy invited Portuguese from Brazil to launch a military invasion of Banda Oriental. Afraid to lose this province to the Portuguese, Buenos Aires made peace with the Spanish viceroy. British pressure persuaded the Portuguese to withdraw in late 1811, leaving the royalists in control of Montevideo. Angered by this betrayal by Buenos Aires, Artigas, with some 4,000 supporters, retreated to Entre Ríos Province. During the Second Banda Oriental campaign in 1813, Artigas joined José Rondeau's army from Buenos Aires and started the second siege of Montevideo, resulting in its surrender to Río de la Plata.

Artigas participated in the formation of the League of the Free People, which united several provinces that wanted to be free from the dominance of Buenos Aires and create a centralized state as envisaged by the Congress of Tucumán. Artigas was proclaimed Protector of this League. Guided by his political ideas (Artiguism), he launched a land reform, dividing land to small farmers.

Brazilian province

The steady growth of the influence and prestige of the Liga Federal frightened the Portuguese government, which did not want the League's republicanism to spread to the adjoining Portuguese colony of Brazil. In August 1816, forces from Brazil invaded and began the Portuguese conquest of the Banda Oriental with the intention of destroying Artigas and his revolution. The Portuguese forces included a fully armed force of disciplined Portuguese European veterans of the Napoleonic Wars with local Brazilian troops. This army, with more military experience and material superiority, occupied Montevideo on 20 January 1817. In 1820, Artigas's forces were finally defeated in the Battle of Tacuarembó, after which Banda Oriental was incorporated into Brazil as its Cisplatina province. During the War of Independence of Brazil in 1823–1824, another siege of Montevideo occurred.

The Thirty-Three

On 19 April 1825, with the support of Buenos Aires, the Thirty-Three Orientals, led by Juan Antonio Lavalleja, landed in Cisplatina. They reached Montevideo on 20 May. On 14 June, in La Florida, a provisional government was formed. On 25 August, the newly elected provincial assembly declared the secession of Cisplatina province from Empire of Brazil and allegiance to the United Provinces of the Río de la Plata. In response, Brazil launched the Cisplatine War.

This war ended on 27 August 1828 when Treaty of Montevideo was signed. After mediation by Viscount Ponsonby, a British diplomat, Brazil and Argentina agreed to recognize an independent Uruguay as a buffer state between them. As with Paraguay, however, Uruguayan independence was not completely guaranteed, and only the Paraguayan War secured Uruguayan independence from the territorial ambitions of its larger neighbors. The Constitution of 1830 was approved in September 1829 and adopted on 18 July 1830.

The "Guerra Grande", 1839–1852

Soon after achieving independence, the political scene in Uruguay became split between two new parties, both splinters of the former Thirty-Three: the conservative Blancos ("Whites") and the liberal Colorados ("Reds"). The Colorados were led by the first President Fructuoso Rivera and represented the business interests of Montevideo; the Blancos were headed by the second President Manuel Oribe, who looked after the agricultural interests of the countryside and promoted protectionism.

Both parties took their informal names from the color of the armbands that their supporters wore. Initially, the Colorados wore blue, but, when it faded in the sun, they replaced it with red. The parties became associated with warring political factions in neighboring Argentina. The Colorados favored the exiled Argentinian liberal Unitarios, many of whom had taken refuge in Montevideo, while the Blanco president Manuel Oribe was a close friend of the Argentine ruler Juan Manuel de Rosas.

Oribe took Rosas's side when the French navy blockaded Buenos Aires in 1838. This led the Colorados and the exiled Unitarios to seek French backing against Oribe, and, on 15 June 1838, an army, led by the Colorado leader Rivera, overthrew Oribe who fled to Argentina. The Argentinian Unitarios then formed a government-in-exile in Montevideo, and, with secret French encouragement, Rivera declared war on Rosas in 1839. The conflict would last 13 years and become known as the Guerra Grande (the Great War).

In 1840, an army of exiled Unitarios attempted to invade northern Argentina from Uruguay but had little success. In 1842, the Argentinian army overran Uruguay on Oribe's behalf. They seized most of the country but failed to take the capital. The Great Siege of Montevideo, which began in February 1843, lasted nine years. The besieged Uruguayans called on resident foreigners for help. French and Italian legions were formed. The latter was led by the exiled Giuseppe Garibaldi, who was working as a mathematics teacher in Montevideo when the war broke out. Garibaldi was also made head of the Uruguayan navy.

During this siege, Uruguay had two parallel governments:
 Gobierno de la Defensa in Montevideo, led by Joaquín Suárez (1843–1852).
 Gobierno del Cerrito (with headquarters at Cerrito de la Victoria neighborhood), ruling the rest of the country, led by Manuel Oribe (1843–1851).

The Argentinian blockade of Montevideo was ineffective as Rosas generally tried not to interfere with international shipping on the River Plate, but, in 1845, when access to Paraguay was blocked, Great Britain and France allied against Rosas, seized his fleet, and began a blockade of Buenos Aires, while Brazil joined in the war against Argentina. Rosas reached peace deals with Great Britain and France in 1849 and 1850, respectively. The French agreed to withdraw their legion if Rosas evacuated Argentinian troops from Uruguay. Oribe still maintained a loose siege of the capital. In 1851, the Argentinian provincial strongman Justo José de Urquiza turned against Rosas and signed a pact with the exiled Unitarios, the Uruguayan Colorados, and Brazil against him. Urquiza crossed into Uruguay, defeated Oribe, and lifted the siege of Montevideo. He then overthrew Rosas at the Battle of Caseros on 3 February 1852. With Rosas's defeat and exile, the "Guerra Grande" finally came to an end. Slavery was officially abolished in 1852. A ruling triumvirate consisting of Rivera, Lavalleja, and Venancio Flores was established, but Lavalleja died in 1853, Rivera in 1854, and Flores was overthrown in 1855.

Foreign relations
The government of Montevideo rewarded Brazil's financial and military support by signing five treaties in 1851 that provided for a perpetual alliance between the two countries. Montevideo confirmed Brazil's right to intervene in Uruguay's internal affairs. Historia do Brasil / por Henrique Handelmann [traducção brasileira feita pelo Instituto historico e geographico brasileiro]. Translated by Lucia Furquim Lahmeyer. Rio de Janeiro: Imprensa nacional, 1931.}}

In accordance with the 1851 treaties, Brazil intervened militarily in Uruguay as often as it deemed necessary. In 1865, the Treaty of the Triple Alliance was signed by the Emperor of Brazil, the President of Argentina, and the Colorado general Venancio Flores, the Uruguayan head of government whom they had both helped to gain power. The Triple Alliance was created to wage a war against the Paraguayan leader Francisco Solano López. The resulting Paraguayan War ended with the invasion of Paraguay and its defeat by the armies of the three countries. Montevideo, which was used as a supply station by the Brazilian navy, experienced a period of prosperity and relative calm during this war.

The Uruguayan War, 1864–65

The Uruguayan War was fought between the governing Blancos and an alliance of the Empire of Brazil with the Colorados who were supported by Argentina. In 1863, the Colorado leader Venancio Flores launched the Liberating Crusade aimed at toppling President Bernardo Berro and his Colorado–Blanco coalition (Fusionist) government. Flores was aided by Argentina's President Bartolomé Mitre. The Fusionist coalition collapsed as Colorados joined Flores's ranks.

The Uruguayan civil war developed into a crisis of international scope that destabilized the entire region. Even before the Colorado rebellion, the Blancos had sought an alliance with Paraguayan dictator Francisco Solano López. Berro's now purely Blanco government also received support from Argentine Federalists, who opposed Mitre and his Unitarians. The situation deteriorated as the Empire of Brazil was drawn into the conflict. Brazil decided to intervene to reestablish the security of its southern frontiers and its influence over regional affairs. In a combined offensive against Blanco strongholds, the Brazilian–Colorado troops advanced through Uruguayan territory, eventually surrounding Montevideo. Faced with certain defeat, the Blanco government capitulated on 20 February 1865.

The short-lived war would have been regarded as an outstanding success for Brazilian and Argentine interests, had Paraguayan intervention in support of the Blancos (with attacks upon Brazilian and Argentine provinces) not led to the long and costly Paraguayan War. In February 1868, former Presidents Bernardo Berro and Venancio Flores were assassinated.

Social and economic developments up to 1900

Colorado rule
The Colorados ruled without interruption from 1865 until 1958 despite internal conflicts, conflicts with neighboring states, political and economic fluctuations, and a wave of mass immigration from Europe.

1872 power-sharing agreement

The government of General Lorenzo Batlle y Grau suppressed the Revolution of the Lances, which started in September 1870 under the leadership of Blanco Timoteo Aparicio. After two years of struggle, a peace agreement was signed on 6 April 1872 when a power-sharing agreement was signed giving the Blancos control over four out of the thirteen departments of Uruguay—Canelones, San Jose, Florida, and Cerro Largo—and a guaranteed, if limited representation in Parliament. This establishment of the policy of coparticipation represented the search for a new formula of compromise, based on the coexistence of the party in power and the party in opposition.

Despite this agreement, Colorado rule was threatened by the failed Tricolor Revolution in 1875 and the Revolution of the Quebracho in 1886. The Colorado effort to reduce the Blancos to only three departments caused a Blanco uprising of 1897 that ended with the creation of 16 departments, of which the Blancos now had control over six. The Blancos were given one third of the seats in Congress. This division of power lasted until President Jose Batlle y Ordonez instituted his political reforms which caused the last uprising by the Blancos in 1904 which ended with the Battle of Masoller and the death of Blanco leader Aparicio Saravia.

Military in power, 1875–1890

The power-sharing agreement of 1872 split the Colorados into two factions—the principistas, who were open to cooperation with the Blancos, and the netos, who were against it. In the 1873 Presidential election, the netos supported election of José Eugenio Ellauri, who was a surprise candidate with no political powerbase. Five days of rioting in Montevideo between the two Colorado factions led to a military coup on 15 January 1875. Ellauri was exiled and neto representative Pedro Varela assumed the Presidency.

In May 1875, the principistas began the Tricolor Revolution, which was defeated later in the year by an unexpected coalition of Blanco leader Aparicio Saravia and the Army under the command of Lorenzo Latorre. Between 1875 and 1890, the military became the center of political power. The Presidency was controlled by colonels Latorre, Santos and Tajes. This period lasted through the Presidencies of Pedro Varela (January 1875–March 1876), Lorenzo Latorre (March 1876–March 1880), Francisco Antonino Vidal (March 1880–March 1882), Maximo Santos (March 1882–March 1886), Francisco Antonino Vidal (March 1886–May 1886), Maximo Santos (May 1886–November 1886), and Maximo Tajes (November 1886–March 1890).

In 1876, Colonel Latorre overthrew the Varela government and established a strong executive Presidency. The economy was stabilized and exports, mainly of Hereford beef and Merino wool, increased. Fray Bentos corned beef production started. Power of regional caudillos (mostly Blancos) was reduced and a modern state apparatus established. Latorre was followed by Vidal and Santos, during whose rule rebels from Argentina invaded on 28 March 1886, but they were soon defeated by Tajes. On 17 August 1886, in a failed assassination attempt, President Santos was shot in the jaw. Faced with mounting health and economic problems, he resigned on 18 November 1886, and Tajes was then elected president.

During this authoritarian period, the government took steps toward the organization of the country as a modern state, encouraging its economic and social transformation. Pressure groups (consisting mainly of businessmen, hacendados, and industrialists) were organized and had a strong influence on government. In a transition period during the Tajes Presidency, politicians began recovering lost ground and some civilian participation in government occurred.

Immigration
After the "Guerra Grande" there was a steady increase in the number of immigrants, which led to the creation of large Italian Uruguayan and Spanish Uruguayan communities. Within a few decades, the population of Uruguay doubled and Montevideo's tripled as most of the recent immigrants settled there. The number of immigrants rose from 48 percent of the population in 1860 to 68 percent in 1868. In the 1870s, a further 100,000 Europeans arrived, so that, by 1879, about 438,000 people were living in Uruguay, a quarter of them in Montevideo. Due to immigration, Uruguay's population reached one million in the early 20th century.

Economy
The economy saw a steep upswing after the "Guerra Grande", above all in livestock raising and export. Between 1860 and 1868, the number of sheep rose from 3 to 17 million. The reason for this increase lay above all in the improved methods of husbandry introduced by European immigrants.

In 1857, the first bank was opened: Montevideo's Banco Comercial. Three years later, a canal system was begun and the first telegraph line was set up. In 1868 rail links were built between the capital and the countryside. The Italians set up the Camera di Commercio Italiana di Montevideo (Italian Chamber of Commerce of Montevideo) which played a strategic role in trade with Italy and building up the Italian middle class in the city. In 1896, the state bank, Banco de la Republica, was established.

Montevideo became a major economic center of the region. Thanks to its natural harbor, it became an entrepôt, or distribution hub, for goods from Argentina, Brazil, and Paraguay. The towns of Paysandú and Salto, both on the Uruguay River, also experienced similar development.

Social

Despite the dictatorships and political turmoil of the 19th century, a number of positive social davcnes nevertheless took place.  A law of 1838 required “the deduction of one day’s pay per month from the salaries of public employees in order that civil pensions and retirement allowances might be serviced.” In 1896, a teachers’ pension and retirement fund was set up. In terms of public health, an early action involved the establishment of a large market in Montevideo “to improve the highly unsanitary conditions under which meat and other foods had been sold.” In 1853, the Old City took steps to extend its rudimentary sewer system, and Montevideo became the first Latin American city to have a complete sewerage system. Action to provide running water started in 1866. In 1847 the legislature passed an ordinance providing for vaccination against smallpox, while vaccination (which began for schoolchildren as early as 1829) became compulsory for infants in 1850. The 1850’s also saw “the first systematic and extensive steps taken to provide quarantine and disinfection services.” In 1883 a “House of Disinfection” was established in Montevideo and 4 years later a lazaret which was considered a model of its kind was established on the Isla de Flores. In 1871 and 1878 regulations were issued to “govern the construction of conventillos in terms of aeration and sanitation.” In the early 1830s Uruguay’s first real hospital, the Charity Hospital, was established at Montevideo.  In education, Uruguay’s first school law was passed in 1826, while the first budget for public instruction “involved the munificent sum of 10,800 pesos.” A project for a national university was approved in 1833, and organizations were formed in 1847 and 1848 to develop and control primary and secondary education. In 1849, the University of Montevideo (officially the University of the Republic) was established on July 18, 1849.  In 1878 the first law to set up a free public education system was approved.  A decree of November 28, 1882 , provided that public lands , occupied by tenants, may be used for the formation of agricultural colonies. A Law of July 20, 1889, created the National Commission of Charity and Public Welfare.

Despite these developments, Uruguay suffered from numerous social and economic inequalities. As noted by one study, “The government had not as yet turned its attention to the relations of labour and capital: there was no regulation of the labour of women and children, no provision for accidents, no official means of protest for employees against unfair treatment, no restrictions on the hours of work.” Rural workers experienced low wages and poor living conditions and were wholly dependent on the will of the landowner, and while slavery had been abolished in the forties “the rural worker was still without defences against the landowner and was a willing instrument in the hands of political leaders.”  As noted by another study, wire fences cut down the need for hands, with excess hands asked or forced to leave. They were dragooned into the army or drifted in rural slums known as peblos de ratas (rat towns). 

Measures to mitigate the problems of Uruguayan society would be undertaken during the course of what became known as the Batlle era.

Batlle era, 1903–33

José Batlle y Ordóñez, President from 1903 to 1907 and again from 1911 to 1915, set the pattern for Uruguay's modern political development and dominated the political scene until his death in 1929. Batlle was opposed to the coparticipation agreement because he considered division of departments among the parties to be undemocratic. The Blancos feared loss of their power if a proportional election system was introduced and started their last revolt in 1904, which ended with the Colorado victory at the Battle of Masoller. Previously elected to the Senate in 1898, Batlle became President of the Senate a year later and thus, according to one study, "second-ranking elective official in the country, until a coalition of conservative Colorados and Blancos expelled him from the post in 1900. He continued his organizational and ideological efforts within the party, however, with much success, so that in 1903 he finally became the President of the Republic. The country's highest post allowed him nearly full control of public policy and the opportunity to forward his broad program of social and economic reform."

After victory over the Blancos, Batlle introduced widespread political, social, and economic reforms, such as a welfare program, government participation in many facets of the economy, and a new constitution. Between 1904 and 1916, according one study, "the triumphant sector of the Colorado Party, Batllism, emphasized social programs and what the philosopher Carlos Vaz Ferreira (1915) denominated pobrismo (focus on poverty), constructing a state that was intended to be the "shield of the weak" (Perelli 1985)." According to one study, Batlle ratified his war victory "with the 1905 electoral victory which put his supporters into the legislature and his lieutenants in control of the party organization all over Uruguay. Having secured his position, he was ready for reform." In the legislative election that Batlle called for January 1905, his hand-picked candidates won the majority of seats. According to one study, "It was the first election in thirty years in which the outcome was not predetermined." In the 1905 elections for the House of Diputados, Batlle’s sector the Batllistas won 57.7% of the vote. In subsequent elections for the House of Diputados and the Constituency Assembly the Batllistas continued to perform well, winning 64.2% of the vote in 1907, 79.9% of the vote in 1910, 60% of the vote in 1913, 45.2% of the vote in 1916, 49.3% of the vote in 1917, 29.5% of the vote in 1919, and 52.2% of the vote in 1920. As noted by one study, “Until 1917, Batllismo dominated the successive elections and obtained its best result in 1910 with 79.9 % of the votes.” As noted by another study, "The institutional difficulty resulting from the complex reading of the results was apparently not immediately perceived by contemporaries, but it came to the forefront when in January 1917 the legislative elections held according to the traditional rule of public vote gave Batlle back control of both chambers."

The Batlle era saw the introduction of various reforms such as new rights for working people, the encouragement of colonization, universal male suffrage, the nationalization of foreign-owned companies, the creation of a modern social welfare system. Under Batlle, the electorate was increased from 46,000 to 188,000. Income tax for lower incomes was abolished in 1905, secondary schools were established in every city (1906), the right of divorce was given to women (1907), and the telephone network was nationalized (1915). Unemployment benefits were introduced in 1914, and an eight-hour working day was introduced in 1915. In 1917, Uruguay proclaimed a secular republic.  In 1910 a hospital for children and an asylum were constructed, while building started on a hospital for tuberculosis patients. In 1915, a Maternity House, asylums for older children, a milk program for children up the age of two, and a service in medical emergencies in homes were initiated. Hospital services "also began to improve in the capital cities of the interior" while small asylums were set up for abandoned mothers and their children in some rural towns. Research institutes were also founded, while a children’s hospital, an orphanage, a senior citizen’s home and military hospital were also built. In 1920 a second public hospital was established in Montevideo was established to provide general services, while another facility provided exclusive care for the elderly and beggars. In 1927 the minimum wage for public functionaries was introduced. Various reforms in education were also carried out. Public secondary education was instituted while university education was reformed, "creating new schools for professionals." In 1912 secondary schools were set up in each of the 18 departmental capitals of the interior "and incorporated into the Secondary Education Section of the University that operated in Montevideo (Universidad de la Republica). A secondary night school was established in 1919 "so that adults who had not finished secondary school could continue their formal education." The National Commission for Charity and Public Welfare was authrorized to create a "Gota de Leche" clinic. A period of land reform lastly roughly between 1913 and 1923, with 2 laws passed that established 10 agricultural "colonies" totalling "about 75,000 acres, divided into farms averaging about 100 acres in size." Through support provided by the superior Government, Public Assistance was able to open the first Gota de Leche Clinic in the city of Montevideo at the start of 1908.

A number of projects were approved during Batlle's first presidency, such as an increase in resources allocated to teaching, the contracting of a loan of for the construction and improvement of roads, free distribution of seeds and clothing to poor farmers, the permanent sale of seeds on behalf of the State, the creation of the Faculties of Veterinary Medicine and Agronomy, and the creation of colonies on expropriated estates in Paysandú. According to one study, the modifications introduced to the initial proposal made the expropriation impossible. In 1904 an Education Pension Fund established in 1896 was extended to include the administrative employees of the school system. That same year, a Civil Service Pension Fund was set up that was aimed at regularizing the civil-service pension system "while expanding both coverage and benefits." The Assembly modified the retirement and civil pension system in this way:

"Public employees who have more than 10 years of service and are unable to continue due to illness, disability or advanced age; employees who, after having served the same number of years, cease due to termination of employment or exoneration, not due to omission or crime; and those with more than 30 years of service and 60 years of age. The mother, the widow and the minor and unmarried children of public employees are entitled to a pension. The Fund is integrated with the help of a monthly fee of 6,000 pesos paid by the State, (doubled later), the monthly discount of one day's salary for employees (5% later) and other lesser taxes. The funds will be invested in public debt securities. Retirement will be as many thirty-thirds of the average salary that the employee has enjoyed in the last five years, as long as the years of service rendered. The pension in favor of the relatives of the employee, will be half of the retirement, Retirements and pensions can not be seized or disposed of."
 
In 1903, the executive branch had to "actively attend to the seed supply service in various agricultural regions of the country", which had punished by drought and the subsequent loss of crops. Stimulated by the first successes of the distribution, it authorized the Department of Livestock and Agriculture to establish a Seed Station on the fiscal lands of Toledo. A later year, the Assembly enacted a law "authorising the Executive Branch to allow the free importation of seeds for three years". The subsequent losses of agriculture gave rise "to the Public Powers intensifying their stimulating action" with a 1906 law authorizing the government to help abandoned farmers with food and seeds. A supplementary credit of 50,000 pesos was allocated for this purpose. In 1904, the Executive Power appointed a commission in charge of drawing up a protection plan for morally and materially destitute minors. In July 1903, a resolution was sent by Defense Minister Jose Serrato to the General directorate of Public Instruction, creating night courses for adults. In 1906, departmental high schools were created.

Batlle's time in office also saw the improvement of roads, the construction of bridges and ports, the navigation of some important interior rivers, the creation of the Veterinary and Agronomy Schools, the construction of school buildings worth $1,000, 000, the improvement of many services, the start of construction of the Pereira-Rossell Children's Hospital and the inauguration of the Military Hospital.  In 1905, Batlle negotiated and obtained from the Assembly the abolition of 10% and 5% reductions on salaries of less than $360 a year.  Decree established the Central Board of Aid, “under whose supervision the National Charity Commission acted, in the relief and hospitalization of the wounded and sick of the civil war of 1904.” A law that authorized the introduction of electric traction in the trams of La Comercial had been vetoed by the Government of Battle's predecessor Cuestas in 1902 on the grounds that the traction systems were in their infancy and that the term of 75 years was excessively long. One of the first measures of Batlle's administration consisted in the withdrawal of that veto, and thanks to this the work began immediately. The Executive Power justified this decision by arguing that the change of traction was a progress that Montevideo demanded and that it would have "effective repercussions in the improvement of the housing of the working class, due to the ease with which he will be able to transpose daily the distances that separate the habitual center of occupations from the localities where land ownership can still be obtained relatively cheaply."

Sanitation works were also carried out, while yielding to the exhortation of the Executive Power, the Charity Commission granted the "Uruguayan League against Tuberculosis” a monthly subsidy of $2,000 which the same Executive Power obtained after it was raised to $3,000, invoking the importance of the work undertaken by the League. The Conversion and Public Works Loan Law passed in 1906 earmarked $1,000,000 for school construction. That amount was reinforced with $200,000 and later with $300,000 during Battle's second administration. The University curriculum was expanded, foreign professors and technicians were brought in, and scholarships for study in Europe and the United States were set up. University expansion took place, A decree authorized a long-needed house-to-house property reassessment of Montevideo; “the decree required land to be evaluated separately from improvements.” For the first time, army and police uniforms were required to be made from Uruguayan cloth, while the government also stipulated the piece rate paid the seamstresses who sewed the uniforms. Under a law of the 27th September 1906 the anme of an enterprise was changed to Usina Eléctrica de Montevideo, “with exclusive privilege of selling electric light and power in Montevideo for twenty years.” The Executive was given power to fix rates, while profits “after setting aside 15 per cent for reserves, were to go to the Junta Económico-Administrativa de Montevideo. The Act’s original purpose had been to enable the Usina to meet power requirements, but the law was passed on the promise of lower lighting rates and better service on the insistence of the Cámara de Representantes.

Various developments in Public Assistance also took place during Batlle’s first presidency. As noted by a 1905 presidential message

“In the past year, the National Charity Commission has had to attend, apart from the ordinary services entrusted to it by law, the numerous wounded and sick from the armed forces, and provide the mobilized corps and the organized expeditions with by the Central Aid Board, the healing elements and the necessary medicines. This extraordinary attention has not prevented, however, the continuation of the expansion and improvement plan begun in previous years, among them worthy of mention the completion and fitting out of the new women's department in the Asylum for Beggars and Chronic People; the expansion of the infirmary of the Asylum for Foundlings and Orphans; the inauguration of electric lighting in the Hospital; several sanitation works in the Isolation House and other works, although of less importance, all tending to improve the hygienic conditions of the Nursing Homes and Hospices. The National Commission has also cooperated with its revenues to support the Dispensaries of the Anti-Tuberculosis League and some departmental hospitals, and has contributed, by dispensing prescriptions free of charge, to the action of Home Public Assistance and various philanthropic societies.”

In a 1906 presidential message, other developments in public charity, hygiene and health were noted:

"After having fulfilled the primary duty of rendering solicitous care to the sick wounded of the last conflict, the Government has devoted its attention to the improvement of this important branch, and hopes to obtain satisfactory results. During this period, the National Council of Hygiene sponsored the project of one of its members on the creation of establishments called 'Gota de Leche,' so beneficial to the health of children and to the education of mothers because it provides them with resources and knowledge to raise their children properly. This mission was entrusted to the National Commission of Charity and efforts will be made to complete it through a law that protects newborns and prevents their mothers from abandoning them when exercising the profession of wet nurses. By continuing to apply the current international sanitary agreement, said Council planned to establish a disinfection center in the port, and by accepting said project, the Government offered to provide a credit of $32,000 to be repaid. In addition, said Council was authorized to acquire a steamer equipped with the necessary apparatus for the maritime health service. It was proposed to create the post of terrestrial health inspector whose mission will be to travel to any point in the Republic where an epidemic develops in order to adopt the appropriate measures with due authority and competence. At present, a project to reform the organic law of the Council, the formation of the 'Codex medicamentarius' and several regulations that have to complete the health service are being studied. For the rest, the sanitary state of the Republic is excellent and the municipal authorities cooperate with the National Council of Hygiene to improve all this service and ensure that the ordinances are strictly applied and that a true zeal is shown in combating contagious diseases."

A progressive supporter of labor rights, Batlle also presided over a number of pro-labor policies. Batlle had identified his Colorado Party with labor, stating in April 1887, regarding a demonstration that was organized in Montevideo "It is true : in the Colorado Party, the element of the people predominates, the working classes." In a speech he made during his first presidency, Batlle described his Colorado Party as one that was concerned with peoples' well being, stating that "I cannot accompany you in supporting the motto that you carry "Down with peace", because my duty as President of the Republic is to guarantee peace and harmony, because peace means advancement, progress, the well-being of the people, which is the true motto of the Colorado Party. I declare that if I had been brought to this position to provoke the war, I would not have accepted it; but I can guarantee that in this conflict, in which the Nation has been so unjustly involved, I will preserve by all legal means the Colorado Party's stay in power, which currently means the stability of the constitutional order, making an effort at the same time to avoid bloodshed, the ruin of national wealth and all the horrors that civil content brings, as an obligatory procession. It is not enough for the Party to have power, it is necessary to govern to do good, it is necessary to govern with honor for the same." One 1913 study reflected this view, stating that (in relation to the late Nineteenth Century) “In the proximity of the '73 elections, and as always, his first act was to formulate a concise exposition of ideas that honors our party annals. This was the obsessive concern of our party, to root more and more in the field of law, freedom and social justice.”

During Batlle's first presidency regulations on police procedure during strikes were promulgated for the first time. Police had to remain neutral, protecting both the right to strike and the right to work. Also for the first time during Batlle's first presidency on May Day labor demonstrators were granted police permits to parade through the center of Montevideo. According to one study "They sang the Internationale and heard fiery speeches. One speaker exulted that Uruguay now led South America in modern ideas because of its President’s liberalism." On another occasion during his first presidency, Batlle helped resolve a rail stike. This occurred after a union formed by railroad workers madea list of demands that the railroad rejected, including dismissal payments to men over 50 who were discharged, 2 days off with pay every month, wages of 80 pesos a month for locomotive engineers and 1 peso and 20 cents a day for manual laborers, and an 8-hour day 6 months a year and a 10 hour day the other 6 months. Claudio Williman, the railroad’s former attorney, was sent by Batlle to offer himself as mediator. As noted by one study, the railroad “knew Batlle’s pro-labor sympathies, verified by Williman’s presence, and accepted most of the striker’s demands, It drew a line at recognizing the union, but promised to take back the strike leaders in due time-a remarkable concession. The jubilant strikers returned to work.”

Batlle also prepared a labor reform project aimed at improving working conditions, although legislative realities delayed the time in which he submitted this to the legislature for consideration. According to one study, "One reason why Chamber debate on divorce and kindred bills had been allowed to drag was the certainty that the Senate, as presently constituted, would not be disposed to their passage." Following senate elections in 1906, the Executive sent Batlle's labor project to the legislature. Explaining in a post-election interview why he had held the bill back for so long, Batlle stated that

"I have worked to prepare a plan of social reforms, all designed to look after and to liberate the working classes. But you must realize that up to now we have had a Senate composed of good patriots, but conservatives. The new Senate, on the other hand, will be entirely liberal and will not put obstacles in the way of the reforms. The workers already know that they will find protection in the government. I believe – in effect – that in countries like ours, where the problem of liberty is already resolved, it is necessary to begin to resolve social problems."

The project provided for an eight-hour limit "in the strenuous and intensive occupations and ten hours in the less exacting commercial occupations" while a one-year transition period was provided "during which an additional hour per day was permitted." It also provided for regulation of the labour of women and children, a weekly rest day, and prohibition of the labour of women for four weeks after child-birth "during which period the State would provide suitable financial support." The bill's main objective was the eight-hour day but despite having a workable majority in Congress "he was unable to persuade his party to accept this radical innovation." On 26 June 1911 a new labor bill was sent to Congress by Batlle which provided for an eight-hour day "without the intermediate period of one year established in his earlier bill and with broadened coverage," repeated provisions as to weekly rest and child labour, and increased the compulsory period of rest after child-birth to forty-five days.  On May 31, 1913, the Chamber approved in general Batlle's project modified by its Labor Commission, with provisions on child labor and women's work left aside to include them in a separate project, as well as the day of rest, with 44 votes in favor and 8 against. However, it wasn't until late in 1915 that a law providing for an eight-hour day was passed.

Various Colorado Party platforms were also drafted and/or adopted during Batlle’s first presidency. In September 1905 (above source) the Colorado Executive Committee and the Colorado legislators entrusted Pedro Manini Rios to draft a pre-electoral manifesto that would serve as a party program. Manini summed up Colorado accomplishments in 40 years of power and outlined a 5-point program. This included constitutiona reform, concern for labor, economic self-suffciency, increase of rural population, abd reduction of taxes on consumption. As noted by one study however, “None of the points proposed anything specific. For example, the labor plank invoked the standard consoling fiction “It is an exaggeration to present these problems in our society in the almost dreadful terms in which they are agitated … in some European societies.” “ In 1907 Jose Espalter was tasked with drawing up a party program that would include constitutional refor, separation of Church and State, municipal autonomy, and labor legislation. The program favored reduction of condumption taxes and the enacting of progressive taxation, not of the magnitude that would despoil private fortunes but rather “a limited and moderate progression, whose rate oscillates between certain limits.” In addition, the State had a right to intervene in labor questions, but “It is a matter of elevated inspiration and exquisite tact.” At the end of the Batlle's first government in February 1907, the National Convention of the Colorado Party met and formulated a declaration of principles. These were "Reform of the Constitution; universal suffrage, that is, authorization to vote in favor of all citizens; election of the President of the Republic directly by the people; proportional representation of the parties; autonomous municipalities; the rights of assembly and association are not expressly enshrined in the Constitution and that gap must be filled; separation: of Church and State; easy naturalization of foreigners; decrease in consumption taxes, establishing instead a progressive tax; solution of problems related to capital and labor, within the limits of justice, law and freedom."

Following the end of his first presidency, Batlle went on an extended tour of Europe and other foreign parts. By December 1909, agitation was begun by the Colorado Party to make him their candidate in 1911. A small conservative anti-Batlle sentiment within the Colorado Party "was lost in a growing tide of enthusiasm for a renomination." On July the 3rd 1910 Batlle’s candidacy was unanimously proclaimed by the party’s national committee. Batlle stated in a letter to the party’s committee while he was in Europe the kind of platform he could stand for. Apart from his reiterated advocacy of an eight-hour day, Batlle "took a stand for popular instead of legislative election of the national president; for proportional representation of parties in the congress; for assurance of such workers’ rights as those to life, health, and culture; for full protection of children, women, the ill, and the aged; for free and assisted immigration; for free public instruction in all its levels and obligatory education at the elementary level; for assistance to stock raising and agriculture and the stimulation of national industry; for the organization by the state of all services social interest." According to one study, "Truly it was a broad platform, hewn to a political design far in advance of its time."

Further reforms were carried out during Batlle's second presidency. In order to prepare materials for the study of the labor problems, the Executive Power resolved in 1913 that the Labor Office would include a number of topics in its program such as Cost of living in relation to wages, Offer and job demand, Labor census, Situation of the worker element, Labor legislation, and Organization of employers and workers. On May 17, 1912, a law was approved providing for the creation of the Women's Section of Secondary Education. A law was also promulgated establishing a national commission of physical education. Under a law of 21 July 1914 industrial employers, including those in state and municipal establishments, "were required to install safety devices to prevent accidents in the use of machinery." The law required that "dangerous machinery should be inspected, if necessary; that steam engines, wheels, and turbines be accessible only to their operators; that women and children should not be employed in the cleaning or repair of machinery in motion; that gears be shielded; that masons and painters working at a height of more than 3 metres be protected by a rail 90 centimetres on each side, etc." Foreign professors were hired to establish new university schools such as agronomy and veterinary medicine, agricultural and home economics courses were established for rural youth, and study missions were sent abroad. In regards to salary discounts, The Executive Branch addressed the Assembly requesting that the discount suffered by Passive Classes in general be reduced to 10%. The measure came to favor 3,739 people. The Assembly also completely abolished the 19% tax on assignments and salaries that did not exceed $660 per year and reduced that of the largest to 10%. Another law more effectively protected retirees and school pensioners. The capital of the Bank of the Republic, which issued currency and directly loaned money to the public, was substantially increased, while a series of economic-development institutes in fishing, geological drilling, industrial chemistry, agriculture and ranching were set up. A bill that was converted into law and put into execution authorized an issue of Public Debt for the amount of $500,000 "for the purchase or expropriation of land that would be divided into farms and resold on the basis of combinations with the Mortgage Bank of Uruguay." These colonization centers would be set up "in the most appropriate places due to the unnatural nature of the land, its proximity to the roads of communication and transportation facilities to the centers of consumption, for which 'the necessary facilities of the railways would be opportunely managed, and around the Agronomic Stations, as a means of taking advantage of the progressive impulse of the high agricultural education and the suggestive example of the experimental farms." Under an Act of January the 19th 1912 a rural credit section was established within the Bank of the Republic and the formation of local rural credit banks was authorized. By the law of January 11, 1912, the effects of a provision of 1906 that authorized the Executive to import cereal seeds for resale at cost price, free of customs duties, were extended.

In 1912 the government purchased control of the National Mortgage Bank "and proceeded to liberalize the bank’s loan policies. More attention was given to small loans and loans on rural property." Ownership of small farms was encouraged, with the bank purchasing large tracts of land and selling them to settlers in parcels usually 60 acres or less, and purchasers of such parcels were granted a tax exemption of 10 years. According to a 1956 study, since the time the Mortgage Bank was converted from a private to a government-owned and –operated status, "it has been active, though by no means monopolistic, in mortgage financing both in urban and rural areas." A State Insurance Bank was opened in 1912 which assumed a prominent role in the fields of fire and workmen’s compensation. As noted by one study, Batlle sought to centralize insurance services "through a state monopoly to lower rates and increase public confidence." Under the State Insurance Bank, insurance was provided for risks such as death, labor accidents, fires, and hail. 

The State Insurance Bank was established on 11 January 1912, and started operations in Fire insurance on 1 March, in workmen’s compensation 15 March, and in hail, human life, pedigreed-animal life, marine, glass, and automobile civic responsibility insurance later that year. In 1914 it initiated a campign to promote old age provision among the poorer classes. As noted by one study, this type of insurance, known as Seguro popular, “was offered without medical examination and without rigid requirements for payment of premium. The poor man was enabled ‘to substitute an insurance policy for a savings bank account.’ With an ordinary policy he might lose by being unable to continue paying premiums due to loss of his job, but with seguro popular he could deposit money whenever he wished; in the event of becoming incapacitated he withdrew the full amount of his contributions plus 6 percent interest; if he died before the date of policy payment his savings would go to his heirs; if he lived to old age he had a permamnet income.” A law of 10 November 1916 “provided that capital payments up to $5,000 and income up to $1,200 annually derived from seguro popular could not be attached.” However, “Seguro popular (really a deffered annuity with special clauses) failed to gain favour with the public and in 1936 there were less than 200 policies of that type outstanding.” 

Other highlights of Batlle’s reform program in 1912 included the division of the country into new military zones, creation of an institute of industrial chemistry, the promulgation of a law making the supply of electric light and power a country-wide state monopoly, a bill for suppressing bullfights, decreeing of a law of literary and artistic copyright, approval of an urbanization plan for the city of Montevideo, and the issuance of regulations for a school of nursing. Under a law of 21 October 1912, the State was given, through the Usinas Eléctricas del Estado, "a monopoly of the supply of electric light and power throughout the country." Labour benefited from this decision, with the first budget of Usinas Eléctricas providing for a general increase in wages "which was intended to bring the wage scale up to that of other public utilities and to offset the rising cost of living."

A law of January 1913 authorized the issuance of a loan of 500,000 pesos destined for the purchase and division of land. With the promulgation of the law of 22 January 1913, the State began its direct action "which acquires or expropriates lands to sell them based on the mortgage credit to the settlers. In doing so, it seeks, undoubtedly, to eliminate by competition the colonizing companies that had little or no regard for the interests of the colonists, and that for the same reason — and especially due to the peremptory terms for repayment of the loan — led to failure to most colonizing attempts." The aforementioned law authorized the P.E. to issue a colonization loan worth 500,000 pesos, for "purchase and subdivision of land for agricultural colonization." (art.2) The lots "will be sold in cash or for a term of up to thirty years with a mortgage guarantee, which the P.E. can transfer to the Mortgage Bank by issuing bonds (art.3)."   The same Power is also authorized to expropriate the necessary lands "for which purpose it is already declared of public utility" (art. 4), and said lands "shall be free from the payment of Real Estate Tax for a term of ten years and from executions and embargoes originating from debts contracted by the settlers before and during the first five years, except for mortgages."  Also, to avoid the concentration of land, it is indicated that "no settler may buy more than one farm". On 6 February 1915, by decree of the P.E., "it was a matter of promoting colonization in a certain specialized sense; In effect, the Colonization Advisory Commission is authorized to buy land for forestry, granting properties with payment facilities to whoever commits to carry out forest plantations in a third of its surface."

Various developments in public assistance and child protection also took place during Batlle’s second presidency. A presidential message from 1914, for instance, noted that "The function of assistance and protection of all individuals included in the law of November 7, 1910, has been carefully attended by the authorities who are in charge of fulfilling such a lofty social mission, dedicating their activities to the organization of services respective implanted in great part in the capital and that, gradually it is tried to extend to the departments of the interior. There are 11 assistance houses operating in the capital, including hospitals and asylums, and 12 hospitals, 5 aid rooms and a colony for the insane in charge of the National Public Assistance, with 25,811 individuals having received assistance in all of them during the past year, a figure which had not yet been reached in our country, which indicates the increase that the public service in question has taken." A Permanent Assistance medical service was inaugurated on March the 1st 1913, with  "its true importance could be appreciated, proving its undeniable usefulness, to the point that there has already been a need to expand the elements it has, in order to respond, if not in a complete way, at least very effective, to the needs of the population. The number of emergency assistance, 11,600, in just ten months of operation, is the most eloquent demonstration of the usefulness that the new service provides." Measures were adopted to relieve overcrowding in the Hospital Maciel, including the acquisition of Doecker pavilions, while "The lease of the building in which the British Hospital was installed for many years was resolved, in order to expand the services of the Maciel Hospital, and thus, using that premises, and the extensions that were also made in the year 1913 in the Germán Segura Pavilion, a bit of relief has been achieved for the old Charity Hospital, even though it has not been able to stay within its hygienic proportions." In addition, other improvements "can be noted in the Maciel Hospital during the past year. The transfer of the Electricity Section to another more apparent location within the same Hospital, which contemplates the most rigorous demands of science and in which a very complete installation of apparatus has been made; the installation in a place near the aforementioned establishment, of the Urinary Tract Clinic, whose service is attended by a truly extraordinary number of patients; the replacement of the current poor lighting of the surgery rooms by a system adopted with great success in the United States and in some European countries, having empowered the General Directorate to acquire the necessary equipment, and others, are important improvements made in the said hospital."

In the Vilardebó Hospital, with a capacity for 600 patients, the amount of 1,500 alienated was reached, while the women's section, which is the one in the worst conditions, "has been alleviated with the installation of the new Doecker pavilions in which about two hundred alienated women have been given lodging. As for the men section, the transfer of some one hundred to the Alienated Colony, and the adoption of other measures that will be put into practice, allow us to suppose that in the future the situation of the referred hospital will improve." Also, "In the course of the past year, the existing facilities in the Alienated Colony have been completed, which were converted into large pavilions for alienated persons, having transferred to them more than 200 inmates, in unbeatable conditions, insofar as it is related to hygiene and safety. comfort they enjoy. In addition to the construction of the kitchen, dining room for the sick and related services, a Doecker pavilion with 25 beds and chalets were built for the director, administrator and butler's homes." Ina addition,  "Active work has been done to complete two works of great importance: one refers to the new pavilions of the Fermín Ferreyra Hospital, which will accommodate 240 patients. These pavilions are now completely finished, and very soon they will be released to public service. The other work to which I refer is the Maternity Pavilion and Shelter for Pregnant Women, which is also expected to be enabled as soon as possible." Also, in the Asilo Dámaso Larrañaga, the construction of the classrooms, which occupy the upper part of the building facing San Salvador Street, was completed. This work, for which all requirements in terms of capacity, ventilation and light have been considered, allowed the expansion of the original, insufficient premise. Also, "The benefits that are expected from the School of Nurses, and the convenience of definitively incorporating it into Public Assistance, led to the acceptance of the offer of sale made by the owners of the building in which it is installed."

In the departmental hospitals, many works were carried out by the directing authorities of Public Assistance, "in order to install new services and expand the existing ones. Refurbishments have been carried out in the Molo and Salto hospital buildings, installing electric light service in them. The construction of the San Eugenio Hospital is nearing completion. The magnificent building of the Hospital de la Colonia has been completed and enabled, having transferred to it the Aid Room, which worked in precarious conditions. It is a hospital built in accordance with the modern progress of hospital hygiene. Significant improvements have been made in the Durazno Aid Room, with the construction of an operating room, a restroom and an autopsy room." Also, several ordinances "with the approval of the government have been put into force in the previous period, being able to cite the one that includes epidemic cerebro-spinal meningitis among those of obligatory declaration; the one that authorizes the use of a poster announcing the presence of contagious diseases; the one that declares disinfection optional in cases of measles; the one that determines certain precepts to avoid contagion of epidemic cerebro-spinal meningitis, etc." Other developments included the installation of a small analysis laboratory in the Prostitution Dispensary and another larger and more complete one in the "Doctor Germán Segura" Pavilion, "which indicate an evident improvement in the health service against avariosis, since by virtue of these works, been able to place the fight against such a terrible evil on a completely scientific terrain. In the Lazaretto of the Island of Flores, a reinforced concrete tank has been built, destined to provide drinking water at all times to the personnel of the Island and to the passengers who remain there for observation. In the aforementioned Island of Flores, the reinforced concrete bridge that permanently ensures the passage between the second and third islands has been completed, a work of real importance that will render innumerable services to that Sanitary Station."

In addition, the work carried out by the Council, "which is in charge of the important services that the law of February 24, 1911, places under its care, indicates an advanced step towards the definitive organization of the protection of abandoned minors. The main point of the task of a diverse nature that has concerned the aforementioned Corporation has been that related to the construction of the buildings that will serve as the seat of the two most important dependencies of the benefactor Institution: the Educational Colony for Men and the Reformatory of girls. The works of the first of the mentioned buildings, for which Your Honorability has sanctioned a law that authorizes the investment of the sum of $100,000,—promulgated on June 16 of last year,—are well advanced, since it is about to be finished. the first pavilion for asylum seekers, the second being halfway through its construction. In addition, the building that will be used for the Subdirectorate and the one that will be the house-room of the Subdirector, are already out of the foundations, and it is expected that this first section of the works will be inaugurated before the middle of the current year. Around $50,000 have been spent on the execution of the two pavilions and the Subdirectorate." Provisional constructions that had started at the end of 1912 were completed, "constructions that put the old pastoral establishment in a position to regularly receive close to one hundred asylum seekers, which include: lodging, with three large bedrooms for minors, rooms for employees, dining rooms for employees and minors, kitchens, storage rooms, pantry and two rooms to teach primary instruction classes." Also, "In the house that served as lodging for the owners of the old cabin and that today constitutes the seat of the central offices of the Colony, a comfortable extension of four rooms was made. In addition, the facilities of the Colony were completed with some rural constructions, pigsties, a cistern and a pool, which is supplied through. a water motor from a well for washing clothes, irrigation pipes, a box for the lighting service, enabling a small pavilion duly refurbished for nursing and medicine cabinet. These works, carried out in the old buildings that existed, and which, with the temporary extensions, have meant that the establishment for the Protection of Minors in question could be operating a year ago, have cost $13,050."

The Council also studied and resolved "many points related to its mission, solving difficulties that have arisen in some cases not provided for by law, issuing consultations, regulating procedures, dealing with various projects of the Departmental Committees referring to campaign minors. , etc. Among them we can mention: the approval of a Regulation that establishes the obligation of periodic visits by the Inspectors to the minors delivered in precarious custody and the creation of a system of checkbooks destined to record the way in which the givers fulfill their mission. ; the formation of the money of the minors who work in the radio workshops assigned to them in the Prison and in the works or tasks of the Colony of Suárez; obligatory intervention of the Council in every transfer of minors to the various houses of Public Assistance, as well as for their retirement; surveillance of certain workshops against which the Council had received a complaint that they imposed excessive hours on minors; intervention of the Legal Advisor of the corporation in all the demands established by the Inspector of the Council to whom the respective power has been granted, in order to legally demand the collection of the monthly payments owed by the guardians to their wards, etc."

A presidential message from 1914 also mentioned various agricultural developments. For instance, the Agricultural Inspectors “have carried out a constant work of extensive teaching, through conferences, consultations, practical lessons, contests, demonstrations, etc., in order to bring the latest agricultural advances to the same rural producer. This is a complementary task of the Agronomic Schools, whose productions can be easily appreciated, since instructing the farmer or rancher on the ground implies the immediate application of the education received for the benefit of increasing and improving rural production.” Also, “With the help of the publications, it has also been possible to bring new teachings to the campaign, using, instead of long-read magazines, bulletins of a few pages, with simple instructions and practices written in a style completely within the reach of our rural inhabitants. Seven of these bulletins have been published in the year, five of which have appeared after the month of September, which reveals the effort made, bringing teachings on fruit horticulture; utility, planting and care of trees; land preparation, seed selection and crop rotation; wheat pairing; orange tree cultivation, etc. These publications have circulated profusely and free of charge throughout the campaign, since the editions carried out so far exceed one hundred thousand copies. In addition, the technical personnel of the Inspection have collaborated assiduously in the Magazine of the Ministry of Industries, as evidenced by the fact that more than twenty works have appeared in that publication, and the Zone Agronomic Inspectors publish teaching articles at least every fortnight.” In addition, “The Seed Section is well advanced in its work to establish control over the seeds that are sold in commerce, so that farmers acquire good quality grains,—and just as the Chemistry Section has established minimum rates for that farmers and landowners can have land, seeds and rural products in general analyzed, with the benefits that can be imagined.”

In 1913, in an attempt to prevent future Presidential dictatorships, Batlle proposed a collective Presidency (colegiado) based on the Swiss Federal Council model. The proposal was defeated in a 1916 referendum, but Batlle then managed to get support from the Blancos and the Second Constitution was approved by referendum on 25 November 1917. Under the new Constitution, a split executive was created, but the President continued to control the ministries of Foreign Affairs, Interior and Defence. The new nine-man National Council of Administration, which consisted of six Colorados and three Blancos, controlled the ministries of Education, Finances, Economy and Health. Claudio Williman, who served between Batlle's two terms, was his supporter and continued all his reforms, as did the next President Baltasar Brum (1919–23).

Batlle kept a handwritten list of how the Senators stood on the linked issues of the eight - hour day and the Colegiado . On the eight - hour day there were "12 in favour, one doubtful and nothing beside the other five." Support for the Colegiado was less certain, with "7 in favour, 5 against, 6 blank."

According to one study Batlle’s fight for the collegiate executive "had overshadowed all else during the closing years of his greatest activity, but Batlle still found time to direct the negotiation of a number of arbitration treaties, to initiate a state-owned railway system, to sponsor a law providing equality of rights between legitimate and natural children, and to prepare a bill establishing pensions for the aged. Batlle’s constitutional reform proposals spilt the Colorado Party; a dissident wing called the riverista Colorados (named after party founder Fructuoso Rivera), according one study, "went off the range on the issue of the collegiate or plural executive." Despite this, the Riversistas called for a number of progressive policies similar to those proposed by Batlle. These included "political rights and civil equality for women; the status of the public official; the Labor Code, with regulations on the work of women and minors; workers' insurance for disability; hygiene and safety in workshops; work accident insurance; measures for forced unemployment; conciliation and arbitration, as a solution to the strike; economical and hygienic rooms for urban and rural workers; assistance improvement and development; vocational technical schools; construction of urban and rural schools, improvement of salaries and guarantees in the appointments and promotions of teaching personnel; compulsory physical education, free vocational education courses, popular libraries; reform of the tax system, deducting essential items; promotion of industries derived from the use of the country's raw material, promotion of public works and improvement of means of transportation.”

Around 1900, infant mortality rates (IMR) in Uruguay were among the world's lowest, indicating a very healthy population. By 1910, however, the IMR leveled off, while it continued to drop in other countries. The leading causes of death—diarrheal and respiratory diseases—did not decline, indicating a growing public health problem.

In 1930, Uruguay hosted the first FIFA World Cup. Although relatively few countries took part, the event provided national pride when the home team won the tournament over their neighbors Argentina.

The reforms of the Batlle era served as a rallying cry for supporters of Batlle's ideas. In the lead up to the November 1919 general elections, the Agrupación Colorada Batllista started publishing its program of works carried out from 1903 to 1918. The points covered were ‘Pacification of the country based on respect for institutions; Abolition of the death penalty; abolition of the levy regime for the army's comeback; administrative and personal honesty; construction of bridges, roads, ports, railways; settlement of divorce; creation of departmental high schools; creation of schools and salary increase for teachers; free high school and university education; creation of the State Power Plants, the Mortgage Bank, the Insurance Bank and the State railways and trams; creation of the Agronomy and Veterinary Schools and the Agronomic Stations; organization of the Business School; construction of university buildings; creation of the Historical Museum, the Natural History Museum and the Museum of Fine Arts; creation of boulevards and public walks; initiative of the League of Nations in The Hague; organization of physical education and sports places throughout the country; establishment of old-age pensions; compensation for work accidents; regulation of women's and children's work; suspension of night work; creation of free chairs and salary increase for teachers; creation of the Institutes of Fishing, Industrial Chemistry, Geology and Drilling; suspension of discounts of 10 and 15% on the salaries of public employees; creation of the Educational Colony for Men; campaign against alcoholism; abolition of the Presidency of the Republic; establishment of the secret ballot, proportional representation and mandatory registration; departmental autonomies; separation of Church and State; vote of women and foreigners; popular insurance; legitimation of natural children; paternity investigation; fight against white slavery; establishment of the conditional sentence; establishment of broad and compulsory arbitration in international litigation; establishment of popular libraries; creation of the School of Dramatic Art and the national orchestra; creation of industrial education; creation of agricultural colonies; establishment of the agrarian pledge, rural credit and agricultural defense; creation of the Women's University; agriculture protection; stimulus laws for the improvement of livestock; foundation of hospitals in the departments; creation of the maternity, the Alienated Colony, the Gynecology Pavilion, the Children's Hospital, the Nursing School, the Vacation Colony, the Outdoor Schools and the Institutes for the deaf.’

A couple of years later, the Convention of the Batllista Association 'decided to sanction a double program of principles to establish which were the previous works of the party, that should be maintained, and, at the same time, specify the aspirations or future achievements.' The works carried out as listed were '1. Democratic-representative institutions. 2. of the Collegiate Government form 3. of Municipal autonomy. 4. General and compulsory arbitration in international matters. 5. Of the separation of the State and the Church. 6. Secret ballot and proportional representation. 7. The abolition, without exception, of the death penalty. 8. On the conviction and parole of criminals. 9. Divorce at the will of the woman, without the need to express cause. 10. From the investigation of paternity. 11. Of the rights of natural children. 12. Of the secularism of teaching. 13. Free primary, secondary, preparatory and higher education. 14. From the absenteeism tax. 15. From the University of Women. 16. From departmental high schools. 17. Of night teaching. 18. Of the agronomic stations. 19. Of the free chairs and progressive salaries to the professors. 20. From the Physical Education Commission. 21. Of the right to assistance. 22. From lay public assistance. 23. The right to livelihood. 24. Of the repression of alcoholism. 25. Of the maximum day of eight hours. 26. From pensions to old age. 27. One day's rest after every five days of work. 28. Compensation for work accidents. 29. From the State Insurance Bank. 30. Of the Bank of the Republic exclusively of the State. 31. Of the nationalization of the Mortgage Bank. 32. Of the nationalization of the Power Plants. 33. Of the nationalization of the telegraphs. 34. Of the nationalization of the services of the Port. 35. Of the nationalization of the Northern Tramway and Railway, the Trinidad al Durazno Railway and the Olmos Junction at Maldonado. 36. Of the construction of the country's railways by the State and for the State. 37. The suppression of bullfights, their parodies, non-simulated pigeon shooting, cockfights, the rat-pit and all shows in which the suffering of animals is provoked as an attraction.'

The Batllistas also listed a number of works to be realised, including  “48. The prohibition of work for children of both sexes under 15 years of age. 49. The reduction to four hours of the work day for young people between 15 and 18 years of age. 50. The reduction to six hours of the working day work of young people between 18 and 20 years of age and of women 51. He increased up to ten pesos in old age pensions 52. The declaration by law that the mother woman deserves well from the Republic, regardless of her marital status 53. The prohibition for women to work during the 30 days that precede childbirth and during the 30 that follow it 54. The creation of nursing homes to house and assist women in the last 30 days of pregnancy and in the 30 days following childbirth or longer if their health requires it, in which they will also be instructed in how to raise children 55. The installation of nursery rooms in establishments where women with children are employed 56. The allowance of $10 per month for one year counted from the month prior to the childbirth to women who support the child even when they have salary or salary, allocation that will be provided from old age pension funds. 57. The increase in the number of asylums or maternity homes until the popular need is fully satisfied in these establishments 58. The fixing of a minimum wage for community workers, based on the main living conditions, among which must be counted in the first place healthy and sufficient food and hygienic housing and arrangement. 59. The fixing of the minimum wage of $30 for farmhands, huts or dairy, 60. The determination of the food that should be given to farmhands, huts or dairy, which must be healthy and sufficient. 61. Rest in shifts of a full day after every five days of work for ranch, cabin or dairy laborers 62. The participation of workers and employees of state companies in their profits and the increase in salaries and wages. 62. The creation of a mandatory minimum insurance of 2/^ of the wage or salary, against unemployment, illness or disability. 64. The creation of retirement and pensions for all those who work on their own account, individuals or the State. 65. The recognition of the right of retirees or pensioners to reside in the country or abroad, and to marry without losing their pension. 66. The establishment in each judicial section of a doctor, at least, designated annually by popular election of the corresponding section, with a monthly salary of not less than $200 to provide assistance to the workers and in general to any person of modest economic situation, according to a reduced rate that will be set by the municipal authorities. 67. The rigorous application of labor, protection and salary laws to the work regime of convents, asylums, congregations and religious associations.”

Several of these reforms would be realized both during and after Batlle’s lifetime.

The coup of 1933
Batlle's split executive model lasted until 1933, when, during the economic crisis of the Great Depression, President Gabriel Terra assumed dictatorial powers.

The new welfare state was hit hard by the Great Depression, which also caused a growing political crisis. Terra blamed the ineffective collective leadership model and, after securing agreement from the Blanco leader Luis Alberto de Herrera in March 1933, suspended the Congress, abolished the collective executive, established a dictatorial regime, and introduced a new constitution in 1934. The former President Brum committed suicide in protest against the coup. In 1938, Terra was succeeded by his close political follower and brother-in-law General Alfredo Baldomir. During this time, state retained large control over nation's economy and commerce, while pursuing free-market policies. After the new Constitution of 1942 was introduced, political freedoms were restored.

Post-Batlle reforms

Further reforms were carried out in the years following Batlle’s passing. Under a law of 25 June 1930, a minimum wage previously established on 18 November 1926 for port workers was extended "to include employees of frigoríficos who load and unload ships." Accident compensation legislation was extended to cover persons employed on field work, while an Act of 22 June 1931 "prescribes Sunday closing for chemists' shops, with the exception of those opening on special duty from 8 a.m. to 10 p.m. Provision is also made for night work." In addition, an Act of 22 October 1931 "provides for an uninterrupted weekly rest of 36 hours from 12.30 p.m. on Saturdays in all commercial establishments except those enumerated in the Act." Under a Decree of 13 April 1934 aimed at establishing "uniform shop-closing hours, which was supplemented and amended by Decrees of 23 May and 4 August 1934, commercial establishments which are closed on Saturday afternoons and which can interrupt their operations at fixed hours without prejudice to the public must close at 7 p.m. Hairdressing establishments must close a t9 p.m. as a rule, and at midnight on Saturdays. These provisions apply to trading in streets and other public places. By agreement between employers and employees establishments may close earlier. Undertakings which do not fulfil the conditions mentioned above are excepted from these provisions, but during the hours when shops covered by the Decrees are closed they may not sell any goods also sold by such shops. The goods in question must be specified on a notice posted in the shop window and inside the shop." On 12 January 1934, the Minister of Public Health was empowered (12 January 1934) to issue regulations governing conditions of work in industrial establishments, while a Decree of 17 February 1934 gave effect "to Public Health Regulations entrusting the Health Inspectorate with factory inspection, etc." On 24 July 1933, a Decree concerning safety in autogenous and electric welding processes for the repair of steam generating plant was promulgated. A Decree of the 5th November1934 "made it compulsory to fit guards to machines for the preparation of macaroni and similar products." A Children's Code provided, among other things, "for a minimum age of 14 years for admission to employment, with some exceptions for school attendance, and for the enforcement of the school attendance provisions." Rules were also laid down "for the organisation of hostels for mothers with young children, working mothers' canteens, day nurseries, etc." Under Administrative Regulations of 24 May 1934, "issued under the Pensions Act, which deal with the superannuation and pension system for persons employed in commerce, industry and public utility undertakings, brings mothers with dependent children under 14 within the scope of the pension scheme, although the amount of the pension has not yet been fixed." An Act of 11 January 1934 "provides that the Ministry of Labour shall establish in the principal town in each department an employment exchange under the Pension Fund for Industry, Commerce and the Public Services."

A Decree of 15 December 1936 regulated "the hours of work of persons employed in places of entertainment open at night" while the Weekly Rest Act of 23 November 1936 provided "that throughout the country shops must be shut on Sunday." To supervise enforcement of the legislation relating to holidays, a Decree of 17 February 1936 "provides that every employer must draw up at the beginning of each year a special table in triplicate, showing the dates on which the members of his staff are to go on holiday. A copy must be sent to the National Labour Institute." Also, on 26 June 1935, the provision of seats was prescribed, which was among positive measures protecting the health of women workers. A Presidential Resolution of 24 February 1938 contained "industrial hygiene regulations covering such matters as medical service in the factory, first-aid, dormitories, canteens, etc." Regulations respecting safety in the construction of scaffolding were amended by a Decree of 7 September 1939, while a Decree was issued "authorising the national board for fuel, alcohol and Portland cement (Administración Nacional de Combustibles, Alcohol y Portland) to include 27,500 pesos in its budget for the payment of family allowances to its manual and non-manual employees from 1 July 1938." Also, a Decree of 19 October 1938 "laid down, for the purposes of the application of labour legislation, a legal definition which finds its main criterion in the preponderance of intellectual or physical effort expended by the wage earner." An Act of 19 November 1937 established the National Institute for Economic Housing, "whose duties are to build houses and provide public services for workers and to encourage privatebuilding." The institution of the family homestead was also introduced by an Act of May 1938.

In March 1939, health registers for workers were introduced, along with periodical medical examination in unhealthy trades, while a Decree of August 1939 "makes it compulsory for employers to provide special protective clothing for workers working in water." A long schedule of diseases was also adopted by a Decree of August 1939 which covered silicosis, among other diseases. A resolution of January 1939 "made provision for instruction in industrial and social hygiene and the training of health visitors." In addition, a Decree of 3 November 1939 dealt with safety in the use of grape pressing machines, and an Act of 22 December 1939 "amended the Act of :23 January 1934 concerning home work and was intended, among other matters, to enable the Minimum Wage-Fixing Machinery Convention, 1928 (No. 26), to be applied. The Act covers home workers of both sexes engaged in manual work for industrial or commercial establishments."

A Decree concerning demolition dated 14 September 1945 "amends Section 70 of the accident prevention regulations of 22 January 1936. Before undertaking any excavation or demolition bordering on the public highway, permission must be obtained from the Directorate of Municipal Works. Neighbouring walls must be adequately shored, and precautions must be taken to prevent heavy falls of material from damaging adjacent buildings. Specified precautions must also be taken when lowering demolition material on to the public highway. As a general rule, buildings must be demolished storey by storey, beginning at the top. When necessary for the safety of the workers, platforms and scaffolds must be used. If other means of protection are not practicable, safety belts must be worn." A Decree respecting dough brakes dated 14 September 1945 "amends Section 19 of the accident prevention regulations of 22 January 1936. It fixes the position of the rolls in the machine,  requires the lower roll to be fenced, and provides for the installation of a handwheel for separating the rolls, of hand and foot brakes, and of protection for gearing, belts and pulleys." A Decree prohibiting the employment of persons whose infirmities predispose them to accidents, dated 14 September 1945, "amends Section 11 of the accident prevent regulations of 22 January 1936, by adding a subsection 13 which prohibits the employment in any occupation of workers who are clearly not in a normal physical or mental condition." A Decree concerning demolition dated 14 September 1945 "amends Section 70 of the accident prevention regulations of 22 January 1936. Before undertaking any excavation or demolition bordering on the public highway, permission must be obtained from the Directorate of Municipal Works. Neighbouring walls must be adequately shored, and precautions must be taken to prevent heavy falls of material from damaging adjacent buildings. Specified precautions must also be taken when lowering demolition material on to the public highway. As a general rule, buildings must be demolished storey by storey, beginning at the top. When necessary for the safety of the workers, platforms and scaffolds must be used. If other means of protection are not practicable, safety belts must be worn." 

A Decree of 15 March 1947 "provides for Government intervention in the settlement of collective industrial disputes by means of conciliation boards." Act No. 10,910 of 4 June 1947 "provides for the establishment of other special boards to deal with transfers of salaried or wage-earning employees of public-utility and analogous undertakings; these are composed of three magistrates or exmagistrates, one to be appointed by the employees, one by the undertaking and the third by agreement between the two sides. In case of failure duly to appoint any member of the board, the appointment is made by the President of the Supreme Court of Justice. This Act does not cover employees with less than ten years' service or those whose work necessarily involves frequent transfer from one place to another." Act, No. 10,913 of 25 June 1947 "provides for the establishment of a joint committee, a conciliation board and a court of arbitration in each undertaking holding a concession for a public service. The joint committee is composed of not more than three representatives of the .undertaking and an equal number of delegates of the personnel, the latter being elected by secret ballot under the supervision of the electoral authority. The committees deal with dismissals, transfers, suspensions, disciplinary action and other causes of difference, as well as with questions relating to the organisation of work and to industrial hygiene and safety."

A statute of 1930 permitted teachers who had worked for 10 years to retire they were mothers of small children. This was later extended to all female workers. In the Fifties retirement benefits "were permitted for those who had been self-employed without ever having contributed to a retirement fund." In terms of housing a 1951 law sheltered the functionaries of the legislative branch. A law was passed in 1953 to meet the requirements of the  banking retirement fund, which in accordance with the BHU administered funds for housing loans, and in 1954 a law was approved for members of the armed forces. A National Housing Plan was also approved, with considerable housing construction in Montevideo and the coastal cities taking place between 1970 and 1972. A law of December 1968, known as the 1968 National Housing Law, also greatly increased the number of housing cooperatives and "specified a detailed regulatory framework for housing cooperatives."

In 1967 a new constitution was approved which instituted 9 years of mandatory education. Private training colleges that had been established in almost all  towns in the interior on the  initiative of the teachers' and parents' associations received a government grant in 1949 The number of school canteens and school milk services increased, as well as the school psychology services.  New classes for handicapped children were also opened. In terms of secondary education, a law of 31 January 1957 "made official seven inland lycées,  set  up an experimental evening school inland and a day lycée and an evening lycée in the capita." In addition, a law of 29 November 1957 "increased by 9 million the 18 million pesos allocated by the 1950 law for the purchase of land the construction of new buildings for lycées and the adaptation and  enlargement  of  existing schools."

In 1934, a program of establishing low-cost restaurants where well-balanced meals could be served to workers at minimum prices was started. Such as restaurants in 1937-38 served "within a single year more than 1,500,000 meals in Montevideo and more than 2,000,000 in other parts of Uruguay." Paid industrial work done in homes was regulated and restricted by laws of 1934 and 1940, while a 1940 law fixed minimum standards for work on rice plantations. Under an Act of 1944 "certain other kinds of rural workers were extended benefits previously granted urban employees." In addition, an Agricultural Workers’ Code, which was enacted in October 1946, south to provide "general coverage to rural workers on such matters as wages, housing, weekly rest and annual holidays, unfair dismissal, etc." Wage councils were set up by a law of November 1943, while systematic legislation for dealing with compensation for dismissal was adopted in 1944. The coverage of family allowances and unemployment subsidies was also extended, while a number of other labor laws were carried out, concerning such matters as vacations, working hours and health insurance.

World War II

Admiral Graf Spee
On 13 December 1939, the Battle of the River Plate was fought a day's sailing northeast of Uruguay between three British cruisers and the German "pocket battleship" . After a three-day layover in the port of Montevideo, the captain of Admiral Graf Spee, believing he was hopelessly outnumbered, ordered the ship scuttled on 17 December. Most of the surviving crew of 1,150 were interned in Uruguay and Argentina and many remained after the war. A German Embassy official in Uruguay has said that his government sent an official letter claiming ownership of the vessel. Any German claim would be invalid because, early in 1940, the Nazi government sold salvaging rights of the vessel to a Uruguayan businessman who was acting on behalf of the British government, and any salvaging rights would have expired under Uruguayan law.

In June 1940, Germany threatened to break off diplomatic relations with Uruguay. In December, Germany protested that Uruguay gave safe harbor to  after it was attacked by a Nazi raider. The ship was repaired with steel plate reportedly salvaged from Admiral Graf Spee.

International relations

On 25 January 1942, Uruguay terminated its diplomatic relations with Nazi Germany, as did 21 other Latin American nations (Argentina did not). In February 1945, Uruguay signed the Declaration by United Nations and subsequently declared war on the Axis powers but did not participate in any actual fighting.

Collapse of the Uruguayan miracle

Uruguay reached the peak of its economic prosperity thanks to the Second World War and the Korean War, when it reached the highest per capita income in Latin America. The country supplied beef, wool, and leather to the Allied armies. In 1946, a Batlle loyalist, Tomás Berreta, was elected to Presidency, and, after his sudden death, Batlle's nephew, Luis Batlle Berres, became the President. In 1949, to cover the British debt for the beef deliveries during WWII, British owned railroads and water companies were nationalized. The 1951 constitutional referendum created the Constitution of 1952 which returned to the collective executive model and the National Council of Government was created.

The end of the large global military conflicts by mid-1980s caused troubles for the country. Because of a decrease in demand in the world market for agricultural products, Uruguay began having economic problems, which included inflation, mass unemployment, and a steep drop in the standard of living for the workers. This led to student militancy and labor unrest. The collective ruling council was unable to agree on harsh measures that were required to stabilize the economy. As the demand for Uruguay's export products plummeted, the collective leadership tried to avoid budget cuts by spending Uruguay's currency reserves and then began taking foreign loans. The Uruguayan peso was devalued, inflation reached 60%, and the economy was in deep crisis.

The Blancos won the 1958 elections and became the ruling party in the Council. They struggled to improve the economy and advocated a return to strong Presidency. After a constitutional referendum, the Council was replaced by a single Presidency under the new Constitution of 1967. The elections of 1967 returned the Colorados to power, and they became increasingly repressive in the face of growing popular protests and Tupamaros insurgency.

The Tupamaros were an urban guerrilla movement formed in the early 1960s. They began by robbing banks and distributing food and money in poor neighborhoods, then undertaking political kidnappings and attacks on security forces. They occupied a city near Montevideo in an operation known as the Taking of Pando. Their efforts succeeded in first embarrassing, and then destabilizing, the government. The US Office of Public Safety (OPS) began operating in Uruguay in 1965. The US OPS trained Uruguayan police and intelligence in policing and interrogation techniques. The Uruguayan Chief of Police Intelligence, Alejandro Otero, told a Brazilian newspaper in 1970 that the OPS, especially the head of the OPS in Uruguay, Dan Mitrione, had instructed the Uruguayan police how to torture suspects, especially with electrical implements.

Military dictatorship, 1973–1985

President Jorge Pacheco declared a state of emergency in 1968, and this was followed by a further suspension of civil liberties in 1972 by his successor, President Juan María Bordaberry. President Bordaberry brought the Army in to combat the guerrillas of the Tupamaros Movement of National Liberation (MLN), which was led by Raúl Sendic. After defeating the Tupamaros, the military seized power in 1973. Torture was effectively used to gather information needed to break up the MLN and also against trade union officers, members of the Communist Party and even regular citizens. Torture practices extended until the end of Uruguayan dictatorship in 1985. Uruguay soon had the highest per capita percentage of political prisoners in the world. The MLN heads were isolated in improvised prisons and subjected to repeated acts of torture. Emigration from Uruguay rose drastically as large numbers of Uruguayans looked for political asylum throughout the world.

Bordaberry was finally removed from his "president charge" in 1976. He was first succeeded by Alberto Demicheli. Subsequently, a national council chosen by the military government elected Aparicio Méndez. In 1980, in order to legitimize their position, the armed forces proposed a change in the constitution, to be subjected to a popular vote by a referendum. The "No" votes against the constitutional changes totaled 57.2 percent of the turnout, showing the unpopularity of the de facto government that was later accelerated by an economic crisis.

In 1981, General Gregorio Álvarez assumed the presidency. Massive protests against the dictatorship broke out in 1984. After a 24-hour general strike, talks began, and the armed forces announced a plan for return to civilian rule. National elections were held later in 1984. Colorado Party leader Julio María Sanguinetti won the presidency and, following the brief interim Presidency of Rafael Addiego Bruno, served from 1985 to 1990. The first Sanguinetti administration implemented economic reforms and consolidated democratization following the country's years under military rule. Nonetheless, Sanguinetti never supported the human rights violations accusations, and his government did not prosecute the military officials who engaged in repression and torture against either the Tupamaros or the MLN. Instead, he opted for signing an amnesty treaty called in Spanish "Ley de Amnistia".

Around 180 Uruguayans are known to have been killed during the 12-year military rule from 1973 to 1985. Most were killed in Argentina and other neighboring countries, with only 36 of them having been killed in Uruguay. A large number of those killed were never found, and the missing people have been referred to as the "disappeared", or "desaparecidos" in Spanish.

Recent history

Sanguinetti's economic reforms, focusing on the attraction of foreign trade and capital, achieved some success and stabilized the economy. In order to promote national reconciliation and facilitate the return of democratic civilian rule, Sanguinetti secured public approval by plebiscite of a controversial general amnesty for military leaders accused of committing human rights violations under the military regime and sped the release of former guerrillas.

The National Party's Luis Alberto Lacalle won the 1989 presidential election and served from 1990 to 1995. President Lacalle executed major economic structural reforms and pursued further liberalization of trade regimes, including Uruguay's inclusion in the Southern Common Market (MERCOSUR) in 1991. Despite economic growth during Lacalle's term, adjustment and privatization efforts provoked political opposition, and some reforms were overturned by referendum.

In the 1994 elections, former President Sanguinetti won a new term, which ran from 1995 until March 2000. As no single party had a majority in the General Assembly, the National Party joined with Sanguinetti's Colorado Party in a coalition government. The Sanguinetti government continued Uruguay's economic reforms and integration into MERCOSUR. Other important reforms were aimed at improving the electoral system, social security, education, and public safety. The economy grew steadily for most of Sanguinetti's term until low commodity prices and economic difficulties in its main export markets caused a recession in 1999, which continued into 2002.

The 1999 national elections were held under a new electoral system established by a 1996 constitutional amendment. Primaries in April decided single presidential candidates for each party, and national elections on 31 October determined representation in the legislature. As no presidential candidate received a majority in the October election, a runoff was held in November. In the runoff, Colorado Party candidate Jorge Batlle, aided by the support of the National Party, defeated Broad Front candidate Tabaré Vázquez.

The Colorado and National Parties continued their legislative coalition, as neither party by itself won as many seats as the 40 percent of each house won by the Broad Front coalition. The formal coalition ended in November 2002, when the Blancos withdrew their ministers from the cabinet, although the Blancos continued to support the Colorados on most issues.

Batlle's five-year term was marked by economic recession and uncertainty, first with the 1999 devaluation of the Brazilian real, then with the outbreaks of foot-and-mouth disease (aftosa) in Uruguay's key beef sector in 2001, and finally with the political and economic collapse of Argentina. Unemployment rose to close to 20 percent, real wages fell, the peso was devalued, and the percentage of Uruguayans in poverty reached almost 40 percent.

These worsening economic conditions played a part in turning public opinion against the free market economic policies adopted by the Batlle administration and its predecessors, leading to popular rejection through plebiscites of proposals for privatization of the state petroleum company in 2003 and of the state water company in 2004. In 2004, Uruguayans elected Tabaré Vázquez as president, while giving the Broad Front coalition a majority in both houses of parliament. The newly elected government, while pledging to continue payments on Uruguay's external debt, has also promised to undertake a crash jobs programs to attack the widespread problems of poverty and unemployment.

In 2009, former Tupamaro and agriculture minister, José Mujica, was elected president, subsequently succeeding Vázquez on 1 March 2010.  Abortion was legalized in 2012, followed by same-sex marriage and cannabis in the following year.

The number of trade union activists has quadrupled since 2003, from 110,000 to over 400,000 in 2015 for a working population of 1.5 million people. According to the International Trade Union Confederation, Uruguay has become the most advanced country in the Americas in terms of respect for "fundamental labour rights, in particular freedom of association, the right to collective bargaining and the right to strike".

In November 2014, former president Tabaré Vázquez defeated center-right opposition candidate Luis Lacalle Pou in the presidential election. On 1 March 2015, Tabare Vazquez was sworn in as the new President of Uruguay to succeed president José Mujica.

In November 2019, conservative Luis Lacalle Pou won the election, bringing the end to 15 years of leftist rule of Broad Front. On 1 March 2020, Luis Lacalle Pou, the son of former president Luis Alberto Lacalle, was sworn in as the new President of Uruguay.

See also

 History of the Americas
 History of Argentina
 History of Brazil
 History of Latin America
 History of South America
 List of presidents of Uruguay
 Politics of Uruguay
 Portuguese colonization of the Americas
 Spanish colonization of the Americas

References

Bibliography

External links